The School of Chinese Medicine at Hong Kong Baptist University is a school in Hong Kong that offers full-time degree programmes in Chinese medicine, Biomedical science, and  pharmacy in Chinese medicine, also offers part-time programmes in Chinese medicine, pharmacy in Chinese medicine, acupuncture, tui na, orthopaedics and beauty care.

Databases produced by HKBU SCM
  Chinese Medicine Formulae Images Database  School of Chinese Medicine, Hong Kong Baptist University. (in English and Chinese)
  Chinese Medicinal Material Images Database   School of Chinese Medicine, Hong Kong Baptist University. (in English and Chinese)
  Medicinal Plant Images Database  School of Chinese Medicine, Hong Kong Baptist University. (in English and Chinese)
  Phytochemical Images Database  School of Chinese Medicine, Hong Kong Baptist University. (in English and Chinese)
  Chinese Medicine Specimen Database  School of Chinese Medicine, Hong Kong Baptist University. (in English and Chinese)
 Chinese Medicine Game-based Exercise School of Chinese Medicine, Hong Kong Baptist University. (in English and Chinese)

See also
 Faculties of Medicine in Hong Kong

External links
  Dr. & Mrs. Hung Hin Shiu Museum of Chinese Medicine  School of Chinese Medicine, Hong Kong Baptist University. (in English and Chinese)

Hong Kong Baptist University